UOVO Fine Art Storage (stylized as UOVO) is a New York City-based art storage space provider that specializes in safeguarding high-value fine art, fashion, interior design, and archival collections.. The company operates three facilities in the New York City area and stored in its facilities are numerous notable works of art and memorabilia from the fine art, music, entertainment and fashion industries.

History 
UOVO was established in January 2013 by Steven Guttman, an art collector and real-estate developer, and Steve Novenstein. The company is named uovo in homage to the Italian word for egg. In 2006, Guttman opened his first fine-art storage facility in the Bronx, New York on the top two floors of a building owned by Storage Deluxe, his other business. Guttman founded UOVO because he felt the demand for art storage far exceeded the capacity of the Bronx facility, and believed he could improve existing art-storage options by creating a purpose-built space to receive and protect fine art.

In early 2013, UOVO announced that it would construct its first purpose-built art storage facility in Long Island City, Queens. The pair of buildings on 22nd Street—which make up the  facility near Queens Plaza—opened in 2014. The facility, built from the ground up, features about 500 storage spaces and private viewing rooms, strict security, as well as advanced cataloging and indexing services. The company offers suites customized for individual collections, workspaces for curators and conservators, as well as specialized transportation services for artwork.

In December 2014, UOVO purchased a warehouse facility in Orangeburg, New York. The  facility located at 33 Kings Highway sits on a  lot. In February 2017, the company opened its third facility, the second in Rockland County. The renovated  facility sits on a  property located at 100 Bradley Parkway in Blauvelt, a subdivision of Orangetown, New York.

The Rubin Museum of Art in New York, a notable client, utilizes UOVO's facilities as an auxiliary storage space for its collections. Although UOVO seldom discloses the items stored in its facilities, the fashion designer Oscar de la Renta has stored his collection with UOVO since 2016. Spanning decades of work, de la Renta's designs are housed, cataloged, and sometimes showcased at UOVO, providing the designer's archivist opportunity to peruse the collection when necessary. UOVO also stores the collections of other notables in the fashion industry, among them PVH Corp.—owners of Calvin Klein Inc.—and the Tommy Hilfiger Group.

In 2021, UOVO opened two new facilities in Delaware and San Francisco. In Delaware, the 50,000-square-foot purpose-designed facility is located with convenient access to key markets on the Eastern Seaboard, including Philadelphia, New York City, and Washington. UOVO’s West-Coast headquarters in San Francisco include facilities in South San Francisco and Livermore that are earthquake- and fire-resistant.

In January 2022, The Brooklyn Museum awarded Oscar yi Hou the third annual UOVO Prize, which recognizes the work of emerging Brooklyn-based artists. Born in Liverpool, England, to Cantonese immigrants, yi Hou is known for vibrantly hued paintings that often depict queer, Asian diasporic subjects, exploring parallels between these two marginalized identities. As the winner of the UOVO prize, yi Hou received a $25,000 grant, was awarded a mural commission, and offered a solo exhibition at the Brooklyn Museum. In July 2022, yi Hou unveiled the  mural at UOVO's fine art storage facility in Bushwick, Brooklyn. Previous UOVO Prize winners include John Edmonds and Baseera Khan.

In March 2022, UOVO announced its expansion to Palm Beach, Florida, with the assistance of the Business Development Board of Palm Beach County. The new expansion will occupy a  facility at 4200 Westgate Avenue. Later that month, UOVO announced its expansion to Dallas, Texas, in partnership with the art collector Howard Rachofsky and art advisor John Runyon. Rachofsky and Runyon renovated an existing Irving building to house the operation. The new acquisition is a 85,000-square-foot facility, located just north of Dallas in Las Colinas.

In June 2022, after the expansion to Palm Beach, UOVO announced its acquisition of Garde Robe, the nation’s leading museum-quality couture wardrobe storage and preservation service. Garde Robe, originally founded in New York in 2001, will occupy a premium garment storage facility in West Palm Beach as part of UOVO’s recommitment to the South Florida region. Garde Robe is the consumer fashion division of UOVO, serving couture collectors, fashion enthusiasts, stylists, and designers through luxury wardrobe management. 

In July 2022, UOVO launched UOVO Art Finance, a way for clients to leverage their art collections while works are safely stored in UOVO's state-of-the-art facilities. Through this program, UOVO offers loans against art from $1 million to $25 million. Using artworks entrusted to its care as collateral, UOVO prioritizes ease of process while ensuring that works are protected with the utmost security for the duration of the loan agreement.

UOVO's team is still lead by Founder and Board of Directors Chairman Steven Guttman. Steve Novenstein and Nick Coslov are UOVO Co-Founders and sit on the Board of Directors, Novenstein as the Co-Chairman. John Auerbach is UOVO's Chief Executive Officer and Caroline Page-Katz is UOVO's President and Chief Operating Officer. 

Between the Long Island City, Brooklyn, Rockland County, Delaware, Miami, Palm Beach, San Francisco, and Denver facilities, UOVO manages nearly 900,000 square feet of storage space in the United States.

References

External links 
 

Companies based in Queens, New York
2013 establishments in New York City
Art museums and galleries in New York City
Art museums and galleries in Queens, New York
Storage companies
Conservation and restoration companies